The Seattle Streetcar is a system of two modern streetcar lines operating in the city of Seattle, Washington. The South Lake Union line opened first in 2007 and was followed by the First Hill line in 2016. The two lines are unconnected, but share similar characteristics: frequent service, station amenities, and vehicles. Streetcars typically arrive every 10–15 minutes most of the day, except late at night. The streetcar lines are owned by the Seattle Department of Transportation and operated by King County Metro.

Current lines

South Lake Union Streetcar

Its route goes from the Westlake transit hub to the Fred Hutchinson Cancer Research Center in South Lake Union. The South Lake Union Streetcar connects with Link light rail (at the Downtown Seattle Transit Tunnel Westlake Station), the Seattle Center Monorail (at the 3rd floor of Westlake Center) and the RapidRide C Line (at several stops). The line opened to the public in 2007.

First Hill Streetcar 

The First Hill Streetcar connects with Amtrak and Sounder Trains (at King Street Station) and Link Light Rail (at both the International District/Chinatown and Capitol Hill stations). The line opened to the public in January 2016.

Future lines

Center City Connector

The Center City Connector project would connect the existing South Lake Union Streetcar at Westlake to the First Hill Streetcar with new tracks along 1st Avenue and Stewart Street in Downtown Seattle. It will serve popular downtown destinations like Pike Place Market, the Seattle Art Museum, Colman Dock and Pioneer Square. The two existing lines would overlap within downtown, increasing frequencies, and the streetcars would operate in an exclusive transit lane. The project is expected to greatly increase ridership on the Seattle Streetcar Network to 20,000–24,000 riders per day (compared to about 5,000 today).

The project was scheduled to begin construction at the beginning 2018 (with utility relocation work starting in mid-2017) and be completed in 2020. In June 2017, the city accepted a $50 million federal grant for the project. In October 2017, members of the Seattle City Council debated cancelling the project and re-appropriating the funds for bus service, but no budget amendments were made.

In March 2018, Mayor Jenny Durkan ordered an investigation of the project and a construction halt for the duration of the review—estimated to take up to three months—in the wake of rising capital costs that were estimated to leave a $23 million shortfall in an overall $200 million budget for building the line. Mayor Durkan announced in January 2019 that the project would be revived if funding is found to cover the entire $286 million cost; it is now estimated to open in 2025 due to new engineering and design work that will be required.

Broadway Streetcar
The currently halted Broadway Streetcar project would have extended the First Hill Streetcar a half-mile farther north on Capitol Hill into the commercial core of Broadway with two stops near Harrison Street and Roy Street at a cost of $28 million. The project would have also included an extension of the protected bike lanes to Roy Street and improvements to the surrounding streetscape. In December 2016, the project was placed on an indefinite hold after the city had completed design work to the 90% stage at a cost of $3 million. The planned extension was halted due to a lack of support from businesses for the design (particularly a shortage of loading zones for delivery trucks) and the financial plan, which would involve taxing properties located along the alignment.

Other proposals

The city government approved the study of a larger, citywide streetcar network in December 2008, estimated to cost up to $600 million. Among the lines studied were a central connector between Seattle Center and the Central District; an extension of the South Lake Union line to the University District; a line traveling to Fremont and Ballard; and an extension of the First Hill line via Rainier Avenue.

Ridership

Rolling stock

The Seattle Streetcar system uses a fleet of streetcars manufactured by Inekon Trams in the Czech Republic. A decade later, six Trio Model 121 streetcars were manufactured for the First Hill line, along with an additional streetcar for additional service in South Lake Union; these are numbered 401–407. Three of the model-121 streetcars were assembled in the Czech Republic and four were assembled, under contract, by Pacifica Marine in Seattle. The Trio Model 121 streetcars are equipped with electric batteries, which are used for a portion of the First Hill route. The delivery of the cars fell behind schedule, leading to delays in opening the First Hill Streetcar.

The original South Lake Union fleet is planned to be replaced with battery-equipped streetcars when the Center City Connector opens. The Portland Streetcar system has expressed interest in acquiring the older vehicles for use on their system. In October 2017, the Seattle Department of Transportation awarded a contract to Construcciones y Auxiliar de Ferrocarriles (CAF) to supply 10 100-percent-low-floor streetcars of CAF Urbos series for the Seattle Streetcar system.  All will be equipped with an on-board energy storage system enabling them to operate away from the overhead wires. Seven of the 10 are for the fleet expansion needed for the opening of the Center City Connector, projected for 2020, and three are being purchased to replace the oldest South Lake Union cars (Nos. 301–303, Inekon model Trio-12), which will be sold after their replacements enter service. Cars 301–303 lack the capability of "off-wire" operation, which means they can only be operated on the South Lake Union line. After the delivery of the new cars and the sale of the three oldest cars, the Seattle Streetcar system will end up with a fleet of 17 streetcars in 2020 or 2021, comprising seven Inekon Trio Model 121 and ten CAF Urbos.

See also
 Seattle Street Railway – The streetcar network that operated in Seattle between 1884 and 1941
 Waterfront Streetcar – A streetcar line that operated in Seattle between 1982 and 2005
 Link light rail – Regional light rail network operated by Sound Transit
 Sounder commuter rail – Regional commuter rail service operated by Sound Transit
 Streetcars in North America
 List of streetcar systems in the United States (all-time list)

References

External links

Seattle Streetcar official site
King County Metro official site
Flickr: The Seattle Streetcar Pool
Guide to the Seattle Municipal Street Railway Photograph Collection: 1913-1940 Special Collections, UW Libraries

Streetcars in Washington (state)
Light rail in Washington (state)
 
Transportation in Seattle
Passenger rail transportation in Washington (state)
Railway lines opened in 2007
2007 establishments in Washington (state)
Town tramway systems by city